Reva Octaviani (born 8 October 2003) is an Indonesian footballer who plays a defender for Asprov Jabar and the Indonesia women's national team.

Club career
Octaviani has played for Asprov Jabar in Indonesia.

International career 
Octaviani represented Indonesia at the 2022 AFC Women's Asian Cup.

Honours

Club
Persib Putri
 Liga 1 Putri: 2019

References

External links

2003 births
Living people
People from Bogor
Sportspeople from West Java
Indonesian women's footballers
Women's association football defenders
Indonesia women's international footballers